Ruacana Constituency is an electoral constituency in the Omusati Region of Namibia on the border to Angola. It had 10,722 inhabitants in 2004 and 9,285 registered voters . Its district capital is the settlement of Ruacana.

The famous Ruacana Falls in the river Kunene are situated in this constituency.

Politics
As in all constituencies in Omusati, Ruacana constituency is traditionally a stronghold of the South West Africa People's Organization (SWAPO) party.

In the 2015 local and regional elections SWAPO candidate Andreas Shintama gained 3,409 votes and won by a landslide, while Daniel Munepapa of the National Unity Democratic Organisation (NUDO) obtained 233, Immanuel Shikongo of the Democratic Turnhalle Alliance (DTA) gained 61, and Abner Uunona of the Rally for Democracy and Progress (RDP) gained 57 votes. Councillor Shintama (SWAPO) was reelected in the 2020 regional election. He obtained 2,959 voted, followed by independent candidate Jackson Tjikomeno with 574 votes and Leonard Kuduva of the Independent Patriots for Change (IPC), an opposition party formed in August 2020, with 429 votes. Shintama was also elected to replace Modestus Amutse as the chairperson of the Omusati Regional Council.

References

Constituencies of Omusati Region
States and territories established in 1992
1992 establishments in Namibia